The ASUN Conference Men's Basketball Player of the Year is an annual basketball award given to the ASUN Conference's most outstanding player. The award was first given following the 1978–79 season, the first year of the ASUN's existence, when it was known as the Trans America Athletic Conference (TAAC). Only two players have won the award three times: Willie Jackson of Centenary (1982–1984) and Darius McGhee of Liberty (2021–2023).

Centenary has the most all-time winners with six, but left the conference in 2000, when the league was still known as the TAAC. There has been only one tie in the award's history, which occurred in 1997–98 between Mark Jones of Central Florida and Sedric Webber of the College of Charleston. Among the 14 current ASUN members, only four have had a winner—Florida Gulf Coast, Liberty, Lipscomb, and North Florida. Of these four schools, only Liberty, which joined the ASUN in 2018 and will leave for Conference USA after the 2022–23 season, became a member after 2007.

Key

Winners

Winners by school

Footnotes

References

Awards established in 1979
NCAA Division I men's basketball conference players of the year
Player